Equator Records or Equator Sound Studios was originally known as East African Records, owned by Afcot Ltd, situated in Nairobi, Kenya.  In 1960, Charles Worrod launched Equator Sound Studios Ltd. along with the Equator Sound Band. Kenyan musician Fadhili William became a member of the band alongside Adolf Banyoro, Peter Tsotsi, Nashil Pichen, Charles Ssongo, Gabriel Omolo, and Daudi Kabaka.

Fadhili and the Jambo Boys Band recorded a number of songs with East African Records between 1959 and 1962. The other band members were Harrison William, Joseph Nazareth, Mumba Charo (Fadhili's brother), Nahshon Gandani, Samuel Lefondo and Sheila Monroe.

Equator Sound Studios, under direction from Worrod at that point, marketed and produced Fadhili's Swahili love-ballad, Malaika, after Worrod realised that the original poorly recorded Malaika could have international appeal.

Malaika had initially been recorded by Jambo Boys, with Konde serving as the studio engineer.

Worrod, who created the "African Twist," left Kenya in 1974 because the law barred him from engaging in the recording business unless he was a citizen. Fadhili later also left, for the US, where he lived for 15 years.

New Equator records
In 2006 a new record label was founded by members of the band Islands, which is also called Equator Records.   There is no connection between the two labels.

See also
 List of record labels

Kenyan record labels
Record labels established in 1960
Record labels disestablished in 1974